The 2021–21 season of Ghanaian club Accra Hearts of Oak S.C. The season covered the period from 20 November 2020 to 8 August 2021.

Season overview 
Hearts of Oak won the domestic double, the league and the FA Cup. They won the league after 12 years wait and a 21 years wait of winning FA Cup. This title was Hearts’ 21st league title in their history putting them only two behind rivals Asante Kotoko's tally of 23. It was their first league triumph for over a decade, with their last success coming in 2009.

Technical team

Squad

Roaster beginning of season

Pre-season and friendlies 
   

The season was delayed as a result of COVID-19 pandemic in Ghana, causing the team to start preparations in September 2021. Hearts however pitched camp at the Glow-Lamp Soccer Academy owned by Nii Odartey Lamptey in Elmina for two weeks between 29 October 2020 to 12 November 2020. They played 5 pre-season friendlies, winning three and drawing two. They scored 14 goals and conceded 4 goals in the process. They were set to play Medeama SC, however the fixture was replaced with one against Proud United.

Competitions

Premier League

League table

Matches

Ghana FA Cup 
Sponsored by MTN, (MTN FA Cup 2021)

Matches

Squad statistics

Goalscorers 
Includes all competitive matches. The list is sorted alphabetically by surname when total goals are equal.

Clean sheets 
The list is sorted by shirt number when total clean sheets are equal. Numbers in parentheses represent games where both goalkeepers participated and both kept a clean sheet; the number in parentheses is awarded to the goalkeeper who was substituted on, whilst a full clean sheet is awarded to the goalkeeper who was on the field at the start of play.

Managers 

  Edward Nii Odoom (2020)
  Kosta Papić (2020–2021)
  Samuel Boadu (2021–present)

References 

Accra Hearts of Oak S.C.
2020–21 Ghana Premier League by team